Tongsin County is a kun, or county, in southern Chagang province, North Korea.  It borders Ryongrim and Chonchon to the north, the counties of Taehung and Yongwon in South Pyongan to the south and east, and Huichon and Songwon to the west and southwest. Originally part of Huichon, it was created in 1952 as part of a general reorganization of local government.

The valley of the Chongchon River lies in western Tongsin.  High mountains rise on all other sides, with the Myohyang Mountains in the south and the Chogyuryong Mountains in the north and east; spurs and outliers of these ranges cover most of the county. The highest point is Ungosusan (웅어수산, 2020 m).

Agriculture and logging are the chief local industries.  13% of Tongsin's land is arable, and most of the remaining 87% is forested. Maize is the principal crop. There are no rail lines in the county, but roads tie it to nearby Huichon and Ryonggang, with a bus service operating between Tongsin and Huichon.

Administrative divisions
Tongsin County is divided into 1 ŭp (town) and 14 ri (villages):

See also
Geography of North Korea
Administrative divisions of North Korea
Chagang

References

External links

Counties of Chagang